A W12 engine is a twelve-cylinder piston engine where three banks of four cylinders are arranged in a W configuration around a common crankshaft. 

W12 engines with three banks of four cylinders were used by several aircraft engines from 1917 until the 1930s. A three-bank design was also used for an unsuccessful W12 engine which was intended to compete in Formula One in 1990.

W12 engines are less common than V12 engines as only a handful of automobile manufacturers use them.
The WR12 engine has been produced by the Volkswagen Group since 2001. This four-bank engine – based on two VR6 engines with a common crankshaft – has only been used in flagship high performance car models produced under the Volkswagen Group.

Aircraft engines 
The Napier Lion was a three-bank design (also called "broad arrow" design) W12 engine produced in the United Kingdom from 1917 to the late 1930s. As well as use in various military and racing airplanes, the Lion was also used in land speed record cars (such as the Napier-Railton and the Napier-Campbell Blue Bird) and racing boats (such as the Miss Britain III).

During the 1920s, the Farman 12We aircraft engine was produced in France. The 12We produced  and was one of the company's best-selling engines in the 1920s.

The Lorraine 12E Courlis is another W12 aircraft engine that was produced in France during the 1920s and 1930s.

Motor racing engines 

The Life Racing Engine F35 used a central master connecting rod, with a slave rod locating onto each side of the master rod, rather than directly onto the crank pin. This meant that there was no offset between the cylinders, reducing the length of the crankpins. The engine was used in rounds 1 to 12 of the 1990 season, however it was unreliable and lacking in power, and the car failed to pre-qualify for any races. The W12 engine was replaced by a third-party V8 engine after round 12.

Road car engines 

The only mass-production W12 engine is the Volkswagen 6.0 WR12 48v, a four-bank design that was first released in 2001. The naturally aspirated variant of the W12 engine has been used in the brands of Audi and Volkswagen. In 2003, a twin-turbocharged version of the W12 engine was produced to be used exclusively in the Bentley Continental GT and Bentley Flying Spur.

The engine is constructed by mating two narrow-angle 15° VR6 engines at an inclined angle of 72°. The narrow angle of each set of cylinders allows just two overhead camshafts to drive each pair of banks, so the W12 engine has the same number of camshafts as a V12 engine. The W12 engine has a very compact design for a 12-cylinder engine, with the overall size of the  engine being smaller than Volkswagen's contemporary  V8 engine.

The first production car to use the W12 engine was the 2001 Audi A8 (D2). The succeeding Audi A8 (D3) and Audi A8 (D4) also had the W12 as an upgrade engine only for the long-wheelbase variant, the Audi A8L W12, which was last available in the 2018 model year. The Audi A8L W12 with its all-wheel drive was unique among its German contemporaries, as 12-cylinder rivals from BMW and Mercedes-Benz used V12 engines with rear-wheel drive.

Other cars to use the W12 engine are the 2003–present Bentley Continental GT, 2005-present Bentley Flying Spur, 2015–present Bentley Bentayga, 2004-2011 Volkswagen Phaeton W12 and the 2005-2010 Volkswagen Touareg W12. The engine was also used in the 2006 Spyker C12 La Turbie and 2008 Spyker C12 Zagato low-volume sports cars.

References

Piston engine configurations
12

ru:W-образный двигатель